The Mooncraft Shiden (also known as 紫電, SHI-DEN or MC/RT-16) is a Japanese Super GT GT300 class prototype race car. The Shiden is a joint venture with a body designed by the Japanese automotive design company Mooncraft (:ja: ムーンクラフト) and produced by the American racing car manufacturer Riley Technologies.

The car is currently used by the Honda-based team Cars Tokai Dream28. In the 2011 season, the team changed their name to Eva Racing as part of a collaboration with the Evangelion franchise, along with painting the Shiden to match the Eva-01.

History

Shiden 77 (1977)
The original Shiden, known as Moon Craft 紫電 Shiden 77 Coupé (or simply "紫電77") debuted in the 500 km 1977 Fuji Grand Champion Series.

Shiden MC/RT-16 (2006)
In 2006 Mooncraft revived the original Shiden with a new bodydesign and entered the Super GT championship under the Privée team.

Chassis

The latest Shiden uses a modified Riley Daytona Prototype as the body's base, hence the "RT-16" in the chassis code.

Technical data
Official technical specifications as unveiled on December 12, 2005:

Body: Carbon/Glass fiber composite
Overall length: 4640mm 	
Height: 1210mm 	
Width: 1985mm 	
Road clearance: 90mm to 120mm (adjustable) 	
Max.Power: 460ps/7800rpm (Power/Weight Ratio = About 2.5) 	
ECU: MOTEC M-880 		
Brake Caliper: Front/6 Pod Monoblock, Rear/4 Pod Monoblock 	
Safety: 6 Point seat belt/Harness, Fire extinguisher, Carbon composite structure (Front, Rear, & Side)

References

External links
  Shiden MC/RC-16 – Press release

Grand tourer racing cars